The 1988 United States Senate election in Indiana was held on November 8, 1988. Incumbent Republican U.S. Senator Richard Lugar was re-elected to a third term.

General election

Candidates
 Richard Lugar, incumbent U.S. Senator (Republican)
 Jack Wickes, attorney (Democratic)

Campaign
Lugar, a popular incumbent, had token opposition in this election. An April 1988 poll showed that Lugar lead 65% to 23%. By June, Lugar raised over $2 million, while Wickes raised just over $100,000. Lugar agreed to debate Wickes on September 10, 1988.

Results
Lugar won overall with two-thirds of the vote and won 91 of Indiana's 92 counties, Wickes won only the Democratic stronghold of Lake County.

See also 
 1988 United States Senate elections

References 

1988
Indiana
Senate